Cities and towns in Namibia are distinguished by the status the Government of Namibia has vested in them: Places in Namibia that are governed by a municipality are cities, places with a town council are towns.

Cities 
 Namibia has thirteen cities, each of them governed by a municipality council that has between 7 and 15 seats. Compared to towns, cities have the authority to set up facilities like public transport, housing schemes, museums, and libraries without the approval of the Minister of Urban and Rural Development. They may also decide to privatise certain services and to enter into joint ventures with the private sector without asking for explicit approval. The thirteen cities are:

Towns 
 Namibia has 26 towns, each of them governed by a town council that has between 7 and 12 seats. Compared to villages, towns have the authority to set up facilities like ambulance and fire fighting services and electricity supply without the approval of the Minister of Urban and Rural Development. They are also responsible for erecting and maintaining community buildings, and they may buy and sell movable property without asking for explicit approval. The 26 towns are:

See also 

 List of villages and settlements in Namibia
 Geography of Namibia
 Regions of Namibia

References

Literature

Further reading

 Alliance of Mayors and Municipal Leaders on HIV/AIDS in Africa
 Commonwealth Local Government Forum Country Profile: Namibia
 Government Gazette of the Republic of Namibia, 1 September 2000, No.2402

Populated places in Namibia
Namibia
Namibia
Cities